Jared Christopher Monti (September 20, 1975 – June 21, 2006) was a soldier in the United States Army who received the United States military's highest decoration for valor, the Medal of Honor, for his actions in the War in Afghanistan.

Monti was deployed with his unit when they were attacked by a group of enemy insurgents. When another soldier was wounded, Monti attempted to rescue him three times and was killed in action. President Barack Obama signed the authorization for Monti to receive the Medal of Honor and the medal was presented to his family in a ceremony, the President's first, at the White House in 2009. Monti was the sixth person from the wars in Iraq and Afghanistan to be awarded the Medal of Honor.

Early life

Monti was born in Abington, Massachusetts, on September 20, 1975, to Paul, a high school Science teacher, and Janet Monti. He grew up in Raynham, Massachusetts and, even as a child, he demonstrated the adventurous character that would later earn him the Medal of Honor. As a four-year-old, he disappeared from the backyard one day, and his mother found him later on hanging by the hood of his sweatshirt on the other side of the fence. On another occasion, a migraine headache kept him home from school, but he left the house and was later found climbing a tree. In 1994 he graduated from Bridgewater-Raynham Regional High School at the age of 18. Monti had two siblings, a sister, Nicole and a brother, Timothy.

Military service

After enlisting in the Army in March 1993, he completed basic training and forward observer training at Fort Sill, Oklahoma and continued his training as a paratrooper with the 82nd Airborne Division. Monti, a fire support specialist, served as a staff sergeant and Fire Support Team sergeant with the 3rd Squadron, 71st Cavalry Regiment, 3rd Brigade Combat Team, 10th Mountain Division. Previous to his service in Afghanistan he earned his British Parachutist Badge with Wings while training in England in 1998 and was deployed to Kosovo in 1999 with Operation Joint Guardian. Despite sustaining injuries as a paratrooper in the 82nd Airborne Division, he rejected a medical discharge and reenlisted to deploy with his unit to Afghanistan in February 2006, as part of Task Force Spartan.

Medal of Honor action
On June 21, 2006, Monti served as the assistant leader of a 16-man patrol and leader of a weapons forward observer team tasked with gathering intelligence in Gowardesh, Nuristan Province, in northeastern Afghanistan. The team established a small base on a ridge to support a larger Army operation in the valley below.  When the larger operation was delayed, Monti's team ran low on provisions. The helicopter that brought supplies revealed the team's position.

That evening, the patrol was attacked by a group of at least 50 insurgents, who had established two positions on a wooded ridge about 50 yards above the patrol and attempted to outflank Monti and his team. The Americans took cover and returned fire, and Monti radioed for artillery and close air support.  Enemy fire killed Staff Sergeant Patrick Lybert. Another Soldier, Private First Class Brian J. Bradbury, was severely wounded and left lying in the open between the enemy and the team's position. Staff Sergeant Chris Cunningham, leader of the patrol's sniper team, called out that he was going to try to rescue Bradbury. Monti replied, "That’s my guy. I am going to get him."

Monti made three attempts to reach Bradbury. On his first, he advanced to within three feet of Bradbury before being forced back by intense machine-gun and rocket-propelled grenade (RPG) fire. His second try was similarly turned back and as the rest of his patrol provided covering fire, Monti advanced a third time but was struck by an RPG. Some news reports indicated that the explosion blew off both of his legs, but this is not supported by family accounts or military records. Monti attempted to crawl back towards cover. He is reported by comrades to have made his peace with God and asked Sgt. Cunningham to tell his parents he loved them. Monti died moments later. At about the same time, the artillery and air support for which he had called began hitting the enemy position, killing 22 of the attackers and dispersing the rest.

PFC Bradbury subsequently died during his evacuation when the cable broke on the rescue hoist lifting him to a 159th Medical Company (Air Ambulance) helicopter. The fall also killed Staff Sergeant Heathe Craig, 28, a medic from Severn, Maryland.

Burial and Medal of Honor ceremony

Monti is buried in section 11, site 38 of the Massachusetts National Cemetery in Bourne, Massachusetts.  The Army posthumously promoted him to sergeant first class.

On July 24, 2009, President Barack Obama signed the authorization for Monti to receive the Medal of Honor for this action. The medal was presented to the family by the President in a formal ceremony at the White House on September 17, 2009. Monti is the 3,448th recipient of the honor since the medal was established by the U.S. Congress during the American Civil War. Additionally, he is the second Medal of Honor recipient from the conflict in Afghanistan, after Navy SEAL Michael P. Murphy, who received the medal in 2007.

Military awards
SFC Monti's  personal decorations include:

Medal of Honor citation

Other honors

On January 13, 2009, Marc R. Pacheco submitted a petition to the Commonwealth of Massachusetts to designate a state owned bridge in the town of Raynham as the SFC Jared C. Monti Bridge.  The motion passed and the state Senate approved for the bridge to be renamed.

A call-for-fire training facility at Fort Sill, Oklahoma, where Monti trained, is named in his honor.

The former Pine Plains Fitness Center on Fort Drum has been renamed the Monti Fitness Facility in honor of SFC Jared C. Monti.

In May 2013, Connie Harrington, songwriter of Lee Brice's number one country hit "I Drive Your Truck," revealed that she wrote the song after listening to Monti's father, Paul, on the public radio program Here & Now. It was Paul Monti's answer to Here & Now when asked what he did to reconnect with his son's memory.

See also

List of Post Vietnam Medal of Honor recipients

Notes

References
Bender, Bryan, "He could not leave a comrade behind", Boston Globe, September 6, 2009.
Cahn, Dianna (September 17, 2009). "Jared Monti’s soldiers watched him give his life, and it changed theirs", Stars and Stripes, .

Phillips, Michael M., "Soldier To Receive Medal of Honor", Wall Street Journal, September 17, 2009.

External links

1975 births
2006 deaths
People from Raynham, Massachusetts
United States Army soldiers
American military personnel killed in the War in Afghanistan (2001–2021)
United States Army Medal of Honor recipients
American people of Italian descent
Burials in Massachusetts
War in Afghanistan (2001–2021) recipients of the Medal of Honor
People from Abington, Massachusetts
United States Army personnel of the War in Afghanistan (2001–2021)
Burials at Massachusetts National Cemetery